Lilias Adie ( – 1704) was a Scottish woman who lived in the coastal village of Torryburn, Fife, Scotland. She was accused of practising witchcraft and fornicating with the devil but died in prison before sentence could be passed. Her intertidal grave is the only known one in Scotland of an accused witch – most were burned.

Biography 
Lilias Adie's first name also appears as Lilly, and her last name was also recorded as Addie and Eddie. In 1704, Adie was held in prison for the crime of practising witchcraft. Her story is preserved in the 1704 Kirk session minutes.

Illness among local residents created a brief but intense period of witch-hunting in the Fife area. A woman named Jean Bizet had accused Adie of witchcraft, proclaiming "beware lest Lilias Adie come upon you and your child." This resulted in the arrest of Adie, who was likely upwards of 60 at the time.

Adie was taken to the local minister, Rev. Allan Logan to answer to the crime of witchcraft.  For over a month she was imprisoned and subjected to day after day of rough interrogation before she finally 'confessed'.

'Confession' 
Adie's 'confession' explained how the devil had been wearing a hat when he first visited her in a cornfield at sunset the first time they met. Under the minister's questioning, she described how the devil had lain with her carnally and made her renounce her baptism. She detailed his physical appearance as having "cold pale skin and cloven-hoofed feet like a cow".

After that first encounter, the devil would then meet her at her house "like a shadow". Adie elaborated that she had gone to other meetings and cavorted with the devil with other witches. Despite repeated questioning Adie would not provide the names of these other witches. Lilias Adie died before her investigation was concluded.

Burial site 

In 2014, interest in Adie's story encouraged the historian and BBC broadcaster Dr. Louise Yeoman and Douglas Speirs, an archaeologist at Fife Council, to look for her burial site. Using 19th-century historical documents, they found a seaweed-covered slab of stone exactly where the documents described: in a group of rocks near the Torryburn railway bridge lay "the great stone doorstep that lies over the rifled grave of Lilly Eadie", and a rock with "the remains of an iron ring".

Lilias Adie had been buried on the beach at Torryburn Bay, in a "humble" wooden box, under this sandstone slab between the low and high tide marks. The "hulking half-ton" stone was indicative of locals' fears that the devil might reanimate her to "torment the living".

Missing remains
Her remains were dug up by antique-collecting grave robbers in 1852. At the time, it was reported that the coffin was 6 feet 6 inches (about 1.98 m) long. Her thighbones were found to be of comparable length with those of a man who was 6 feet (about 1.8 m) tall. She still had most of her teeth, which were "white and fresh". The skull was in the private museum of Dunfermline antiquarian, Joseph Neil Paton in 1875. It was exhibited to the Fifeshire Medical Association in 1884 by a medical doctor from Dunfermline named Dow. It was eventually held at the Museum of the University of St Andrews, but has since disappeared. The skull was exhibited in 1938 at the Empire Exhibition at Bellahouston Park in Glasgow, its last known location.

Adie's coffin was also a source of souvenirs: a walking stick, believed to be made from the wood of her coffin and with a silver band near the handle engraved with "Lilias Addie, 1704", was donated to the Pittencrieff House Museum in Dunfermline in 1927.

Digital reconstruction of her face 
In 1904, two hundred years after her death, photographs were taken of Adie's remains which are now held at the National Library of Scotland.

Using these photographs, in 2017 Dr Christopher Rynn and a team of forensic artists at the Centre for Anatomy and Human Identification (CAHID) at the University of Dundee constructed a 3D virtual model and created a digital image of what Adie's face might have looked like.

Legacy 
Louise Yeoman said of Lilias Adie:

Fife Council has launched a campaign to find out what happened to Adie's remains and give them a proper burial. Speirs stated "It's time to move the narrative away from the Halloween-style figure of the fun witch, and recognise the historic gender bias and suffering that women were exposed to in the name of witch-hunting." Wooden walking sticks constructed from the pieces of the coffin have since been recovered following the campaign launch with Andrew Carnegie a notable recipient  given one such walking stick. Councillor Julie Ford, leading the campaign, said:

On 31 August 2019, 315 years after Adie died in custody, a memorial service was held in Torryburn and a wreath laid at the site of her grave to raise awareness of the persecution these women and men endured in Fife during the witchcraft panics.

Plans have also been mooted for a permanent memorial at Torryburn, dedicated to Lilias and other women who were persecuted across Scotland.

See also 
 Margaret Aitken (the Great Witch of Balwearie, Fife)

References

External links 
 View the digital image of what Lilias Adie's face may have looked like on the University of Dundee's website.
 View Lilias Adie on the map of accused witches in Scotland.

1704 deaths
People accused of witchcraft
17th-century Scottish women
18th-century Scottish women
People from Torryburn
1704 in Scotland
Witch trials in Scotland
Scottish people who died in prison custody
1640 births
Prisoners who died in Scottish detention